Fourteen Foot Bank Light is a lighthouse in the Delaware Bay near Bowers Beach, Delaware. Built in 1885–1886 at the south end of Joe Flogger Shoal, it was the first lighthouse to be built using a pneumatic caisson. A cast-iron base was meanwhile erected on the caisson as it sank. A house-like structure was built on top of the base, designed by H.A. Ramsay and Son of Baltimore. Engineers for the structure were Anderson and Barr, and the contractor was D.P. Heap.

It was added to the National Register of Historic Places in 1989.

References

External links

Lighthouses completed in 1886
Houses completed in 1886
Lighthouses on the National Register of Historic Places in Delaware
Lighthouses in Kent County, Delaware
National Register of Historic Places in Kent County, Delaware